Pangman is a village in the Canadian province of Saskatchewan within the Rural Municipality of Norton No. 69 and Census Division No. 2. Formerly known as West Calder, it is south of the City of Regina.

History 
Pangman incorporated as a village on May 17, 1911.

This location had a post office of the name West Calder from 1909-04-23 through to 1910-08-01. West Calder Post Office was located at Sec.8, Twp.8, R.20, W2. Pangman is currently a village located at Sec. 16, Twp. 8,  R.20, W2.

There are two local history books written about Pangman, including Pangman and Amulet's Past (edited and published by F. Sample with Author Clews, DBCN : AAU-2150), and Update 95 : R.M. of Norton #69 : Pangman, Moreland, Khedive, Forward, Amulet (published in Pangman, Sask. : R.M. of Norton History Committee, c1998)

Demographics 

Education 
Historically, there were three one-room school districts located in the area of Pangman. Pangman School District #98, located at Section Tsp 8, Range 20, west of the 2 Meridian, was formed in 1911. The other two districts were Wild Rose School District #1876 at Tsp 9, Rge 20, west of the 2 Meridian, and Kenneth School District #2016 neighboring at	NW Sec 23, Tsp 8, Rge 20, west of the 2 Meridian.

Airport 
 See Pangman Airport

References

Villages in Saskatchewan
Norton No. 69, Saskatchewan
Division No. 2, Saskatchewan